Martial Corneville is a make-up artist.

On January 24, 2012, he was nominated for an Academy Award for the movie Albert Nobbs.

References

External links

Living people
French make-up artists
Place of birth missing (living people)
Year of birth missing (living people)